Yaanai is a 2022 Indian Tamil-language action drama film written and directed by Hari and produced by Vedikkaranpatti S. Sakthivel, under the banner of Drumsticks Productions. The film stars Arun Vijay and Priya Bhavani Shankar while 
Ramachandra Raju, Samuthirakani, Rajesh, Raadhika Sarathkumar, Aishwarya, Ammu Abhirami, Yogi Babu and Pugazh appear in other prominent roles. The film's music and score is composed by G. V. Prakash Kumar, with cinematography handled by Gopinath  and editing done by Anthony. 

This is the second collaboration of Arun Vijay and Priya Bhavani Shankar after Mafia: Chapter 1 and Vijay's first collaboration with Hari. It was shot extensively across Tamil Nadu including Ramanathapuram, Rameshwaram, Thoothukudi, Palani and the final schedule was wrapped up in Karaikudi.

Yaanai was released in theatres on 1 July 2022, The film was initially scheduled to be released in theaters on 6 May 2022, and got postponed to 17 June 2022, but got postponed again due to Kamal Haasan-starrer Vikram.
 The film opened to generally positive reviews from critics  and became a hit at the box-office, and grossed over  against a production budget of ₹15 crore.

Plot 
P.R.V. is an influential person in Ramanathapuram district, running multiple business ventures all over the Rameswaram. He has 4 sons, 3 of whom: Ramachandran, Sivachandran, and Jayachandran are from his first wife, who died, and the youngest, Ravichandran, from his second wife Muthaaram. PRV loves all of his sons. Ravi loves his brothers dearly, but they always disregard him as their half-brother. Ramachandran manages the main business with 2 two brothers, while Ravi manages their low-income properties. Samuthiram, P.R.V.'s old friend from Rameswaram, blames his family for the death of his younger son, Pandi, and is out to avenge him with his elder son/Pandi's twin brother, Lingam, who is currently in prison. Ravi is the loving protector of P.R.V.'s family, always looking out and preventing his family from getting hurt. He also falls for Jebamalar, who eventually reciprocates his feelings.

Lingam soon gets released from prison after serving 7 years for killing a  cop, who killed Pandi. Ravi realizes that Lingam is out for his family's blood, and secretly tries to protect his family. He soon stumbles upon his half-niece and Ramachandran's daughter, Selvi aka Paapa, with a Muslim boy, Raheem. Although Ravi accepts their relationship, he tries to prevent her from hasty decisions. However, Paapa elopes with Raheem, with the help of Jebamalar, unbeknownst to anyone. Ravi's caste fanatic half-brothers blame him for his inaction, despite knowing of Paapa's affair, and oust him and Muthaaram from their house. P.R.V. dies from the resulting distress. During his funeral, Ravi was not allowed to look at his father, for one last time, but Lingam and Samuthiram were let in. This incident enraged Muthaaram, and she ridicules the PRV brothers. Ramachandran, having lost his respect and family status, orders Pappa's death, to protect his honor.

Ravi decides to take things on his own and tries to locate Pappa. After intense efforts, he finds Pappa in Nagore, but Raheem is missing. Ravi brings her back to their house, where Ramachandran attempts to kill her, but Ravi stops Ramachandran and warns him. The PRV brothers decide to team up with Lingam to kill Ravi's household. Ravi tracks down Raheem, who was kidnapped by Lingam and reunites Raheem with his parents. At night, Lingam's men barge into Ravi's house while he is not home. Although Pappa and Muthaaram try to stop them from breaking in, Lingam and his men managed to enter and begin to attack them. Ravi arrives in time to protect his family from Lingam's attack. Ramachandran gets backstabbed by some of his own men, having been bribed by Lingam, who tries to double-cross the brothers, but he manages to survive the attack. Muthaaram and Pappa get brutally injured and are admitted to the hospital.

Ravi enters their house and tearfully reveals that he had chosen to sever the ties with the family, and reminds him of how he chose to work with Lingam, who went on to backstab him. A guilty Ramachandran reconciles with Ravi, but Lingam kidnaps one of Ravi's brother's child. Ravi begs Lingam to leave her alone, but Lingam doesn't budge. However, Samuthiram is disgusted at Lingam for trying to kill a child instead of the brothers's and distracts him for the child to escape. Lingam proceeds to kill Samuthiram and chases after the girl. Ravi arrives in time to save her and starts chasing Lingam to an island nearby. Ravi thrashes Lingam, but spares him, since he is about to become a father, thus ending the feud peacefully. Pappa, along with Raheem, reunites with Ramachandran. Ravi is also finally accepted as the brother of PRV brothers.

Cast

Production

Development 
The film was tentatively titled as AV33. On September 9, 2021, the film's official title was unveiled as Yaanai by 33 prominent Indian celebrities such as Anurag Kashyap, Vijay Sethupathi, Arya, Pa. Ranjith, Vignesh Shivan, Keerthy Suresh and many more others.

Casting 
Priya Bhavani Shankar was cast in as the female lead opposite Arun Vijay, marking their second collaboration after Mafia: Chapter 1. Ramachandra Raju was reported to play dual roles in the film while veteran actress Radhika and other actors and actresses like Yogi Babu, Samuthirakani, and Ammu Abhirami appear were cast in other pivotal roles.

Filming 
Principal photography of the film began on 3 March 2021 and wrapped up on 7 December 2021.

Music 

G. V. Prakash Kumar composed the soundtrack and background score of the film while collaborating with actor Arun Vijay for first time and director Hari for second time after Seval. The lyrics for the songs are written by Snehan, Ekadasi, Arivu and Hari. The first single "Yelamma Yela" was released on 13 January 2022. The second single " Bodhaiya Vittu Vaale" was released on 11 February 2022. The third single is "Sandaaliye" was released on 17 June 2022. The full album was released by Drumsticks Productions on 30 June 2022.

Release

Theatrical
The teaser trailer of the film was released on 23 December 2021. The film was initially planned for release in theatres on 6 May 2022,but got postponed due to lack of adequate screens. It was later scheduled for 17 June 2022, but got postponed again due to Kamal Haasan's Vikram for record breaking success. The film was finally released in theatres on 1 July 2022.

Distribution
The film is distributed in Tamil Nadu by KKR Cinemas.

Home media
The post-theatrical streaming rights of the film was bought by ZEE5 and the satellite rights of the film was bought by Zee Tamil and Zee Thirai. The film is scheduled to digitally stream on ZEE5 from 19 August 2022. after completing its 50 day theatrical run.

Reception

Box office 
The film opened well with an opening day gross of 15 crore. The film managed to do better on its second day, a weekend, with an increase in box office collections by 22% for a total gross of 30 crore. On its third day, the film grossed 18 crore. The film performed well grossing over 41 crore in Tamil Nadu and 16.3 crore from other territories for a total gross of around 56 crores on day 17. The film have grossed around 70 crore nearing its theatrical end, and went on to become one of the 
highest-grossing Tamil film of the year.

Critical response 
The film received generally positive reviews from critics who praised the direction, performances of the entire cast, emotional quotient, action sequences and background score, but criticized the formulaic plot.

M Suganth of The Times of India gave 3 out of 5 and wrote "Some of the characters are also interesting. If not for Lingam, Samuthirakani's Ramachandran, a casteist, self-centered rich man, would have been the antagonist of the film, and Hari builds his character's are pretty well. Even Ravi isn't perfect, with his views constantly shifting, and Arun Vijay does a good job in putting across this character as a flawed man who means good. We see that he is a product of the casteist, patriarchal culture that he's grown up in, but will always put being humane above all else. Priya Bhavani Shankar and Radikaa score in the couple of scenes that they get while Yogi Babu impresses more in one emotionally charged scene compared to the numerous attempts at comedy."

Praveen Sudevan of The Hindu, after reviewing the film wrote "Arun Vijay, thankfully, is not as loud as some of the earlier Hari protagonists. But he gets to flex his well-worked out muscles, especially in one well-choreographed, single-shot action sequence towards the end of the first half. He tries his best to make the melodramatic scenes work too. The emotional beats of these portions, however, are too generic. Despite the ensemble cast, including Samuthirakani, Radhika, Bose Venkat, Priya Bhavani Shankar, and others, the film hardly succeeds in keeping us engaged." Moviecrow gave the film's rating 2.75 out of 5 and stated "An agmark Hari film, the man is back in action with an emotional actioner that is sure to attract its targeted family audience. He has revamped his style a bit, by improving his presentation skills, but sticking to some of his flaws too with respect to the comedy track. Racy flow is missing at places, nevertheless it’s a satisfying masala flick with a convincing story and strong performance by Arun Vijay." India Herald rated the film 4 out of 5 stars stating that "The fight between the good and the bad would have been interesting to watch if the villain had been more powerful. Although GV Prakash's songs don't really have much impact, the score makes up for it by giving the scenes greater intensity." Karthik Keramalu of Firstpost gave the film's rating 3 out of 5 and stated that "Love alone doesn’t win at the end of the day in Yaanai. Dysfunctional families that remain functional during a malfunction also win here." Bhavana Sharma of Pinkvilla gave 3 out of 5 and wrote "On the whole, Yaanai is a film that is definitely worth a watch this weekend." Indiaglitz gave the film's rating 2.8 out of 5 stating that "Go for this sentimental action film in which Arun Vijay is at his best".

Behindwoods rated 2.5 out of 5 and wrote "Arun Vijay's performance, GV Prakash's music & Hari's Family Drama elements make Yaanai a watchable commercial entertainer." Sruthi Ganapathy Raman of Film Companion after reviewing the film wrote "But some things never change about potboilers, and sadly the film also stands by the genre’s murkier side. Apart from Radhika’s noticeably fierce character arch, the women in the PRV family are reduced to damsels in distress and crying bots, who are often thrashed for their daughters’ attitudes. Priya Bhavani Shankar (who plays Jabamalar, Ravi's love interest) initially comes off as a glitch in the matrix that is this genre, and stands up to the ridiculousness that the men around her spew. But she is also put in her place when her time comes." Navein Darshan of The New Indian Express gave 3.5 out of 5 and wrote "When mainstream cinema brings such wholesomeness and depth, they do warrant some forgiveness from us for its flaws." Ananda Vikatan rated the film 41 out of 100. S Subhakeerthana of OTT Play rated the film 1.5 out of 5 stars, stating that "An average time-pass film that sticks to a tried and tested formula."

References

External links 
 

2022 films
Indian action films
Films scored by G. V. Prakash Kumar
2020s Tamil-language films
Films shot in Karaikudi
Films about twin brothers
Twins in Indian films
Films about the caste system in India
Films shot in Thoothukudi
2022 action films